Hadropogonichthys is a monospecific genus of marine ray-finned fish belonging to the family Zoarcidae, the eelpouts. The only species in the genus is Hadropogonichthys lindbergi which is in the northwstern Pacific Ocean.

The genus was first proposed in 1882 by the Soviet zoologist Vladimir Vladimirovich Fedorov when he described Hadropogonichthys lindbergi from the Kuril Islands. In 2004, a second species was described, H. leptopus from Japan but this has not yet been included in Fishbase.

References

Lycodinae
Monotypic fish genera
Fish described in 1982